Josefine Klougart (born 1985) is a Danish novelist living in Copenhagen. Klougart has studied Art- and Literature at Aarhus University an graduated from the Danish Academy of Creative Writing in 2010. In 2017 she was introduced as guest professor at the University of Bern in Switzerland. Klougart has published 5 novels and three prose books, she has figured in number of collaborative projects, in 2016 she co-published the book Your Glacial Expectations with the Icelandic artist Olafur Eliasson. 

Klougart's novels are translated into 13 languages.  Her latest book New Forest was published in Denmark in November 2016. Klougart's first book Stigninger og fald (Rise and Fall) which earned her a nomination for the Nordic Council Literature Prize in 2011. Her third novel Én af os sover (One of us is sleeping) was nominated three years later. Klougart is a recipient of the Danish Royal Prize for Culture. Together with Danish novelist Hans Otto Jørgensen and editor Jakob Sandvad, Klougart in 2010 founded the activist publishing house Forlaget Gladiator where she is now a part of the management, teacher at the writers school and an editor.

Works

Novels 
 Stigninger og fald (Rise and Fall)
 Hallerne
 Én af os sover (One of us is sleeping)
 Om Mørke, Gladiator 2016
 New Forest

Prose books 
 Den vind man manglede
 Regn
 Novilix

References 

1985 births
Danish women novelists
Living people
21st-century Danish novelists
21st-century Danish women writers